Stanislav Avenirovich Krapukhin (born 28 March 1998) is a Russian football player. He plays in Latvia for FK Auda.

Club career
He made his debut in the Russian Football National League for FC Zenit-2 Saint Petersburg on 8 March 2017 in a game against FC Neftekhimik Nizhnekamsk.

He made his Russian Premier League debut for FC Zenit Saint Petersburg on 21 November 2020 in a game against FC Akhmat Grozny. He substituted Aleksandr Yerokhin in the 87th minute.

On 18 August 2021, he joined Latvian club Riga FC.

Honours
Zenit Saint Petersburg
 Russian Premier League: 2020–21

Career statistics

References

External links
 
 
 Profile by Russian Football National League

1998 births
Footballers from Saint Petersburg
Living people
Russian footballers
Russia youth international footballers
Association football forwards
FC Zenit-2 Saint Petersburg players
FC Tom Tomsk players
FC Zenit Saint Petersburg players
Riga FC players
Russian Premier League players
Russian First League players
Russian Second League players
Russian expatriate footballers
Expatriate footballers in Latvia